Dihydrotetrabenazine or DTBZ is an organic compound  with the chemical formula C19H29NO3. It is a close analog of tetrabenazine. DTBZ and its derivatives, when labeled with positron emitting isotopes such as carbon-11 and fluorine-18, are used as PET radioligands for examining VMAT2.

Use in Positron Emission Tomography

 [11C]DTBZ as a PET radioligand with affinity for VMAT2 was developed in the mid 1990s by David E. Kuhl and colleagues at the University of Michigan. There are two enantiomers of alpha-dihydrotetrabenazine, and the dextrorotary(or (+) isomer) has a high affinity of about 1 nanomolar Ki whereas the levorotary (or (-) isomer) has approximately 1000 fold lower affinity with a Ki of about 2 micromolar.

VMAT2 is a membrane bound protein and a biomarker for Parkinson's disease. Binding of DTBZ to VMAT2 in individuals with Parkinson's disease is significantly reduced. Moreover, the VMAT2 density as determined by [18F]DTBZ has been shown to be well, inversely correlated with the severity of Parkinson's disease.

Avid Radiopharmaceuticals has sponsored clinical trials of [18F]AV-133 (or [18F]Fluoropropyl-(+)-DTBZ) to identify subjects with dopaminergic degeneration.

See also
Nuclear medicine
List of PET radiotracers

References

Articles containing video clips
Catechol ethers
Monoamine-depleting agents
University of Michigan
VMAT inhibitors